HELIOsphere is an annual science fiction and fantasy convention organized by the New Amsterdam Science Fiction and Fantasy Fandom, Inc. first held in March, 2017.

The programming is a typical fan convention, including panel discussions on writing, science, fantasy, gaming, and craft workshops, a games room, and a dance event.

HELIOsphere 2017
The HELIOsphere 2017 Guests of Honor were writers Jacqueline Carey, David Gerrold, and Danielle Ackley McPhail.

Special Guests were author Dr. Charles E. Gannon, and artist Heidi Hooper.

It was held at the DoubleTree Hotel in Tarrytown, New York on the weekend of March 10–12, 2017

Notable Guests and Panelists
Alex Shvartsman science fiction and fantasy writer and editor, and former professional American Magic: The Gathering player
Paul Levinson a writer and professor of communications and media studies at Fordham
Keith DeCandido science fiction, fantasy, and comic book writer
Laura Antoniou a writer and editor known for her work in erotic fiction

HELIOsphere 2018
HELIOsphere 2018 took place at the DoubleTree Hotel in Tarrytown, New York March 9–11, 2018.

Guests of Honor were Eric Flint, Charles Gannon, Cecilia Tan, and Mark Oshiro. The featured artist was Tom Kidd.

HELIOsphere 2019
HELIOsphere 2019 took place April 5–7, 2019 at the DoubleTree by Hilton hotel in Tarrytown, New York.

Guests of honor were Charlie Jane Anders, Laura Antoniou, and Tom Smith, with featured artist Alan F. Beck.

References

External links
HELIOsphere - The Adventure Continues
NASF3 - New Amsterdam Science Fiction & Fantasy Fandom Inc.

Science fiction conventions in the United States
Festivals in New York (state)